Ciara Neville (born 14 October 1999) is an Irish sprinter. In 2018, she won silver as part of the 4 x 100m Irish team at the Youth World U-20 Championships in Tampere, Finland, and also qualified for the semifinal of the individual race. She represented her country at the 2017 European Indoor Championships reaching the semifinals.

International competitions

Personal bests
Outdoor
100 metres – 11.33(+1.0 m/s, Morton Stadium, IRL 2019)
200 metres – 23.60(+0.7 m/s, Oordegem, BEL 2019)
Indoor
60 metres – 7.30 (Athlone 2017)
200 metres – 24.01 (Athlone 2015)

References

1999 births
Living people
Irish female sprinters
Sportspeople from Limerick (city)